Old Wesley Rugby Football Club was founded in 1891 from the past pupils of Wesley College, Dublin. Since then it has become one of Leinster's most famous clubs. It plays in Division 1B of the All-Ireland League. The club won the Leinster Senior Cup in 1909 and 1985 as well as winning the AIL Division 2 title in 1989 and the AIL Division 2A title in 2015. They celebrated their Centenary year in 1991 with a match against a star-studded Barbarians team featuring Internationals such as Eric Rush, Pierre Berbizier and Tony Underwood. They won the eleven-try match in dramatic fashion with a last minute drop-goal to win 37-36.

Through the early 1990s they were one of the most successful teams in Leinster, reaching three cup finals and consistently playing in the 1st Division of the AIL League. Old Wesley RFC were relegated from Division 1 in 1997 and the early years of professionalism marked a tough period for the club.

Old Wesley RFC were crowned AIL Division 3 Champions 2008/2009 following a 30 - 12 victory over Corinthians, gaining promotion to AIL Division 2.

Old Wesley RFC won AIL Division 2A in the 2014/2015 season, gaining promotion to Division 1B.

Honours

Leinster Senior League Shield
Winners: 2011-12:  1

Club Personnel 

The current Club President is Nigel Poff and the Club Captain is Iain McGann. The head coach at the club is Morgan Lennon. The club runs 6 men's teams from the 1st XV to 5th XV, and an Under 20s team. Old Wesley RFC also has a full underage structure from u21s down to u6s, these teams train and play on a Sunday.

Underage Teams 

The Old Wesley RFC U-20 Team won the Premiership 2 title in 2019 and also reached the final of the Purcell Cup Final.

In addition the club runs a full mini & youth rugby section with teams from U-8 level to U-17 level.

Location 

Based in Donnybrook, Dublin 4 on the banks of the Dodder River, Old Wesley RFC share their ground with Bective Rangers FC and the Leinster Branch of the IRFU.

Until 2007 Old Wesley RFC played their junior matches at the Kilgobbin ground near Sandyford which they shared with Lansdowne FC. A new ground at Ballycorus was officially opened on 25 November 2007.

Notable players 

Notable players have included Internationals Philip Orr, Eric Miller, Henry Hurley, Chris Pim, Dave Bursey, Austen Carry, George Hamlet and Eric Campbell. Philip Orr also played on two Lions Tours to New Zealand in 1977 and South Africa in 1980. Previous first team out half David Smith is one of the top scorers in AIL history with over 1,000 points.

References

External links 
Old Wesley RFC

 
Rugby clubs established in 1891
Irish rugby union teams
Rugby union clubs in Dublin (city)
Senior Irish rugby clubs (Leinster)